International Center for Management and India Studies  (ICMIS) is a small educational institution, located in Bangalore, Karnataka, India.  ICMIC has approximately 20 students and 14 staff and faculty. The number of student and staff depend on a semesterly basis and on the courses being offered.

History 

International Center for Management and India Studies (ICMIS) until recently was known as the Centre for American Education (CAE).  ICMIS began operations in Bangalore, India in 1997.  The organization is known to offer American style education in India.  The programs at ICMIS include university level courses which are transferable to many institutions in USA, Canada and the Gulf.  The institution also offers degree and short-term programs.

In 2005, ICMIC moved into its permanent home in Kothanur.  The campus, located at the northern edge of the City of Bangalore, is regarded as somewhat isolated, in a generally developing part of the city.  However rapid development at approx 6 km from the campus has resulted in improvement of infrastructure in the nearby area of Kaminhali.

Academics 
The institution is mostly known to students for its University Transfer program. The program is a two-year program that emphasizes the requirements of the first two years of a U.S. undergraduate degree that includes general educational requirements.  While at ICMIC, students fulfill the general education requirements and, thereafter, transfer these credits to cooperating colleges and universities in the U.S.

The University Transfer Program operates in cooperation with Broward Community College, Florida (BCC). Broward Community College is accredited by the Commission on Colleges of the Southern Association of Colleges and Schools to award associate degrees.  The Commission on Colleges has granted approval for Broward to offer accredited courses and award associate degrees in Bangalore in cooperation with the Centre for American Education.

BCC awards two types of degrees:  the Associate of Arts (A.A.) and the Associate of Science (A.S.).  The Associate of Arts degree was designed as a transfer degree and consists of courses equivalent to those offered to freshman and sophomore students in the lower division of Florida's state universities.  The Associate of Science degree is a career education and transfer degree.

The Center strictly follows BCCs admissions, general education courses, and graduation requirements.  Academically qualified students register at BCC and receive a BCC transcript for classes taken in Bangalore.  This facilitates the transfer of qualified students to higher education institutions in the US and other American programs in the world.  Faculty members credentials are approved by BCC and SACS.

Students 

ICMIS is one of India's smallest Indian institutions, with fewer than 50 students enrolled. Most students are of Indian origin and come from India, USA and the Middle East. The students are represented by the Student Government Association (SGA) which is elected and run by the students.

Colleges in Bangalore
Educational institutions established in 1997
1997 establishments in Karnataka